Winn may refer to:

Places
In the United States:
 Winn, Maine, a town in Penobscot County
 Winn, Michigan, an unincorporated community
 Winn Parish, Louisiana

Other uses
 Winn (surname) (including a list of people with the name)
 WINN, an American radio station
 , a passenger-cargo ship in commission in the fleet of the U.S. Fish and Wildlife Service from 1948 to 1960
 Winn-Dixie, supermarket chain based in Jacksonville, Florida whose NASDAQ stock symbol is "WINN"
 Winn Adami, a character in the science fiction television series Star Trek: Deep Space Nine

See also
 Winn-Dixie 250, NASCAR Busch Series race
 Because of Winn-Dixie, a 2000 children's novel by Kate DiCamillo
Because of Winn-Dixie, a 2005 film adaptation of the novel
 Wynn (disambiguation)